Peter Arnold McDuffe (born February 16, 1948) is a Canadian former ice hockey goaltender who played for the St. Louis Blues, New York Rangers, Kansas City Scouts and Detroit Red Wings in the National Hockey League (NHL) and the Indianapolis Racers in the World Hockey Association (WHA) between 1971 and 1978.

Early life
Born in Milton, Ontario, McDuffe's father, Arnold, was a test pilot and trainer for the Royal Canadian Air Force during World War II stationed at Brandon, Manitoba. In 1920, McDuffe's paternal grandfather, Richard, had established the first John Deere farm implement dealership in Ontario. (Icing on the Plains: The Rough Ride of Kansas City's NHL Scouts, pp. 110–111)

McDuffe made the move from defence to goaltender in peewee around 1958. McDuffe began his junior career in St. Catharines with a Junior B team before being promoted to the A team with the St. Catharines Blackhawks of the OHA in 1964–65, where he played parts of four seasons. In his last season in St. Catharines, McDuffe  won the best goaltending award with a 2.92 GAA.

Career
In 1966–67, he was called up and started two games with the Buffalo Bisons of the American Hockey League.

In 1968–69, he moved to the EHL and played for the Greensboro Generals, where he collected a 36-19-9 record, before being traded to New York Rangers affiliate Omaha in the Central Hockey League.

In the summer of 1970, McDuffe served as a coach at Hockey Haven, a hockey school in Haliburton, Ontario, with NHLers Jim Dorey, Brian Watson, Bill Goldsworthy, and Phil Myre.

McDuffe made the second all-star team with Omaha in 1969–70, and the first all-star team in 1970–71, leading them to championships both seasons. He won the 1970–71 Central Hockey League Most Valuable Player award with the Omaha Knights. He also won the 1971–72 Western Hockey League Leading Goaltender Award with the Denver Spurs.

McDuffe got his first taste of NHL action with the St. Louis Blues, although he was happy to return to the New York Rangers system the following season, stating about the coaching, "In St. Louis, they don't tell you which end of the stick to hold."

Between 1971 and 1976, he played in 57 NHL regular season games with a goals-against average of 4.08.

Honours
He became one of the first inductees in his hometown of Milton, Ontario's Walk of Fame in 2007.

In 2017, he was inducted into the Milton Sports Hall of Fame.

Career statistics

Regular season and playoffs

References

External links

hockeygoalies.org - Peter Arnold McDuffe
New York Rangers all-time roster - 31 Peter McDuffe

Icing on the Plains: The Rough Ride of Kansas City's NHL Scouts, Troy Treasure, 2018, Balboa Press.

1948 births
Buffalo Bisons (AHL) players
Canadian ice hockey goaltenders
Denver Spurs players
Detroit Red Wings players
Greensboro Generals (EHL) players
Indianapolis Racers players
Kansas City Scouts players
Living people
New Haven Nighthawks players
New York Rangers players
Omaha Knights (CHL) players
People from Milton, Ontario
Providence Reds players
Rhode Island Reds players
St. Catharines Black Hawks players
St. Louis Blues players
Sportspeople from Milton, Ontario